Rhodopygia is a genus of dragonflies in the family Libellulidae. They are neotropical species, occurring in Guatemala, Belize through Bolivia and Brazil.

Species
The genus contains the following species:

References

Libellulidae
Anisoptera genera